Emma Villas Volley is a professional volleyball team based in Siena, Italy. The club plays in Serie A1 of the Italian Volleyball League.

Former names
 2013–2015: Emma Villas Chiusi
 2015–2019: Emma Villas Siena
 2019–present: Emma Villas Aubay Siena

History 
Emma Villas Vitt Chiusi was founded in 2013 by detaching itself from Vitt Chiusi Volleyball, from which it inherited the sporting title to participate in Serie B2: the newborn company ranks second at the end of the regular 2013-14 season in its group, obtaining promotion to Serie B1 thanks to the victory of the promotion play-offs against Marconi Volley Spoleto.

In the 2014-15 season he participates in the Serie B1 championship where he wins the regular season and is promoted to Serie A2. In the 2015-16 vintage the club changes its name to Emma Villas Volley and moves its registered office to Siena: it therefore participates in the second national division. In the 2016-17 season club won the Italian Cup in the category by beating Tuscania Volley in the final, while in the following one, thanks to the victory of the promotion play-offs, she was promoted to Serie A1.

In the 2018-19 season he made his debut in the Italian top division, but at the end of the championship, thanks to the thirteenth place in the standings, he relegated to the cadet series.

2022-23 Season was the second times that Emma Villas Siena compete in SuperLega. With five wins out of twenty-two matches, Emma Villas Aubay Siena finished bottom of the 2022-23 Season, it was sent to the second division in 2023-2024 Season.

Statistics

Team
Team roster – season 2022/2023

References

External links 
 Official website 
 Team profile at LegaVolley.it 
 Team profile at Volleybox.net 

Italian volleyball clubs